The Twelve Chairs is a 1928 satirical novel by Soviet authors Ilya Ilf and Yevgeny Petrov.

The Twelve Chairs may also refer to:

Film 
 Dvanáct křesel, 1933, directed by Martin Fric and Michal Waszynski (Czechoslovakia, Poland)
 Keep Your Seats, Please, 1936 UK musical comedy film starring George Formby and Florence Desmond
 It's in the Bag! (1945 film), 1945 US film starring Fred Allen and Jack Benny
 Sju svarta be-hå, 1954, Sweden, directed by Gösta Bernhard
 , 1957, Germany, directed by Franz Antel
 Las doce sillas, 1962 Cuban film directed by Tomás Gutiérrez Alea
 The Thirteen Chairs, 1969, Italy/France, directed by Nicolas Gessner and Luciano Lucignani
 The Twelve Chairs (1970 film), US film directed by Mel Brooks
 The Twelve Chairs (1971 film), Russian film directed by Leonid Gaidai
 The Twelve Chairs (1976 film), 1976 Russian miniseries directed by Mark Zakharov
 Mein Opa und die 13 Stuhle, 1997, Germany, directed by Helmut Lohner
 , 2004 German film directed by Ulrike Ottinger
 The Twelve Seats, 2011, an Iranian film directed by Esmael Barari
 La sedia della felicità, 2013, the last film directed by Carlo Mazzacurati before his death

Opera 
The Twelve Chairs (Shostakovich), an unfinished operetta by Dmitri Shostakovich